Street Fighter: Resurrection is a live-action web mini series developed by director, fight choreographer, writer, actor and martial artist Joey Ansah. The series is based on the Street Fighter video game series by Capcom, its release coinciding with that of Street Fighter V. Resurrection serves as a sequel to the Street Fighter: Assassin's Fist web series, taking place ten years later.

Episodes of the series were released weekly by Machinima via Verizon's go90 app from March 15, 2016 to April 5, 2016. The series was later uploaded to Machinima's YouTube channel on December 19, 2016.

Cast
Christian Howard as Ken Masters
Mike Moh as Ryu
Alain Moussi as Charlie Nash
Natascha Hopkins as Laura Matsuda
Katrina Durden as Decapre
Amy Olivia Bell as Kolin
Silvio Simac as M. Bison 
Alexis Rodney as Matt Furlong
Cengiz Dervis as Agent Daniels
Amed Hashimi as Agent Amari / Mr. Aziz

Production
On December 6, 2015, a trailer for the mini series premiered during the Capcom Cup and Joey Ansah was also announced to be developing the series. The following day, martial arts actor Alain Moussi announced that he would be playing Charlie Nash, while Mike Moh and Christian Howard would reprise their roles from Assassin's Fist as Ryu and Ken. Production of the mini series wrapped up on December 15, 2015. Laura from Street Fighter V, Decapre from Street Fighter IV and Kolin from Street Fighter V also appear in the series portrayed by Natascha Hopkins, Katrina Durden and Amy Olivia Bell respectively.

Music
The music was composed by Patrick Gill with contributions from Ryan Ansah and Daniel Braine.

Episodes

References

External links
 

Ansatsuken
Live-action films based on video games
2010s American television miniseries
American martial arts films
Martial arts television series
Martial arts web series
Street Fighter films
Street Fighter television series
Works based on Street Fighter
Works by Joey Ansah